Beaumont Chase is a civil parish in the county of Rutland in the East Midlands of England. It is to the west of Uppingham, north of Stoke Dry, and on a hillside overlooking Leicestershire. Formerly an extra-parochial area, it was created a separate parish in 1858.

The civil parish's name means 'Beautiful hill'. 'Chase' is a later addition which means a place for breeding and hunting wild animals.

There is only single occupied building, a farmhouse. According to the 2001 census, Beaumont Chase had a population of zero.

References

Civil parishes in Rutland
Uppingham